Catherine Cox is an American actress known for her appearances in television, film, and theatre.

Early life and education 
Cox is a native of Toledo, Ohio, whose mother sang with an all-female orchestra during World War II. Cox graduated from Wittenberg University with a degree in music education.

Career 
A regular on the Broadway stage in the 1980s, Cox's credits include the original Ethel McCormack in the production of Footloose, the musical Oh Coward!, for which she was nominated for a Tony Award for Best Performance by a Leading Actress in a Musical, and Baby for which she won the Drama Desk Award. Other Broadway credits include roles in Rumors, Music Is, Whoopee!, Barnum, and One Night Stand.

Cox has also worked extensively in regional theaters across the United States and in Off-Broadway productions in New York. Off-Broadway she has appeared in productions of William Finn's In Trousers, Rap Master Ronnie, By Strouse, It's Better With A Band, and The Waves. Cox's regional credits include the roles of Donna and Oolie in the Los Angeles production of City of Angels.

Her television appearances include The Cosby Show, Law & Order, The Guiding Light, and Edge of Night.

Personal life 
Cox is married to composer/musical director, David Evans and has two sons.

Filmography

Film

Television

References

External links

American stage actresses
American television actresses
Drama Desk Award winners
Living people
Actresses from Toledo, Ohio
Wittenberg University alumni
21st-century American women
Year of birth missing (living people)

Actresses from Ohio